Paolo Segneri  (21 March 1624 – 9 December 1694) was an Italian Jesuit preacher, missionary, and ascetical writer.

Life

Segneri was born at Nettuno.  He studied at the Roman College, and in 1637 entered the Society of Jesus, not without opposition from his father. Oliva was his first master in the religious life; Sforza Pallavicino taught him theology. Under such guides, his virtues and talents developed to maturity.

He lectured on humanities for several years, and was ordained priest in 1653. By a careful study of Scripture, the Fathers, and the Orations of Cicero, he had prepared himself for the pulpit. He volunteered for the foreign missions, but Tuscany, the Papal States, and the chief cities of Italy were to be the scene of his labours. He preached at first in the great cathedrals, and then for twenty-seven years (1665–92) gave popular missions with an eloquence surpassed only by his holiness. His "Quaresimale" (Florence, 1679, tr. New York, 1874) was read and admired by Antonio Pignatelli, who as Pope Innocent XII summoned the missionary to preach before him, and made him theologian of the Paenitentiaria. Segneri's biographer, Massei, states that "Le Prediche dette nei palazzo apostolico" (Rome, 1694) won the admiration of the pontiff and his Court.  He died in Rome.

After St. Bernadine of Siena and Savonarola, Segneri was Italy's greatest orator. He reformed the Italian pulpit. Segneri at times stumbles into the defects of the "Seicentisti" (Marinisti). The "Quaresimale", "the Prediche", the "Panegyrici Sacri" (Florence, 1684, translated by Father Humphrey, London, 1877), stamp him as a great orator.

Entire districts flocked to hear him; extraordinary graces and favours marked his career. His triumphs left him simple as a child.

Works

In his theological discussion with his superior-general, Thyrsus Gonzalez, who was a firm champion of Probabiliorism, he combined the respect and obedience of the subject with the independence of the trained thinker (cf. Lettere sulla Materia del Probabile" in vol. IV of "Opere", Venice, 1748).

Segneri wrote also "Il penitente istruito (Bologna, 1669); "Il confessore istruito" (Brescia, 1672); "La Manna dell anima" (Milan, 1683, tr. London, New York, 1892); "Il Cristiano istruito" (Florence, 1690). His complete works (cf. Somervogel) have been frequently edited: at Parma, 1701; Venice, 1712–58; Turin, 1855, etc. The "Quaresimale" has been printed at least thirty times. Some of Segneri's works have been translated into Arabic. Hallam criticizes Segneri; Ford is more just in his appreciation.

His book "La concordia tra la fatica e la quiete" speaks about meditation, its techniques and its aims, and is one of the best works on this subject.

References
 Giuseppe Massei, Breve ragguaglio della Vita del Ven. Servo di Dio il Padre Paolo Segneri (Florence, Parma, 1701), tr. In no. 27 of the Oratory Series (London, 1851);
 James Ford, Sermons from the Quaresimale, with a preface relating to the author (London, 1869);
 Henry Hallam, Introduction to the Literature of Europe (New York, 1841), II, 26;
 De Coppier, Le p. Segneri considéré comme Orateur in Études (Dec., 1878);
 Giovanni Trebbi, Il Quaresimale, con discorso ed analisi (Turin, 1883);
 John Morris, The Lights in Prayer of the Ven. Frs. De la Puente, de la Colombiére, and the Rev. r. P. Segneri, S.J. (London, 1893);
 Tacchi-Venturi, Lettere inedite di P. Segneri. . . intorno all'opera segneriana "La Concordia" (Florence, 1903);
 Claudio Bulgarelli, Il P. Segneri e la diocesi di Modigliana (Saluzzo, 1908);
 Alexander Baumgartner, Die Gestichte der Weltliteratur, VI Band, Die italienische Literatur (St. Louis, 1911); Civiltà, 3rd Series, VIII, 454; 15th Series, XII, 257; 16th Series, V, 314; 18th Series, V, 142;
 Benedetto Croce, Saggi sulla letteratura italiana del Seicento, Bari 1948, pp. 155-181;
 Giulio Marzot, Un classico della Controriforma, Palermo 1959;
 Domenico Mondrone, Paolo Segneri, in Letteratura italiana. I minori, III, Milan 1961, pp. 1751-1764;
 Valerio Marucci, L’autografo di un’opera ignota: le “Missioni rurali” di Paolo Segneri, in Filologia e critica, IV (1979), 1, pp. 73-92;
 ;
 Ezio Bolis, L’uomo tra peccato, grazia e libertà nell’opera di Paolo Segneri..., Rome 1996;
 Mario Scotti, «Ségneri, Paolo», in Dizionario critico della letteratura italiana, IV, Turin 1999, pp. 153-155;
 Stefania Stefanelli, Il lessico di Segneri e la lingua italiana: apporti e permanenze, in Studi secenteschi, XLIX (2008), pp. 3-19;
 Clara Leri, I Salmi nel “Quaresimale” di Paolo Segneri, in Predicare nel Seicento, M.L. Doglio and C. Delcorno (eds.), Bologna 2011, pp. 159-196;
 Bernadette Majorana, Predicare per obbedienza. Note sull’ultima attività di Paolo Segneri (1692-1694), in Avventure dell’obbedienza nella compagnia di Gesù. Teorie e prassi fra XVI e XIX sec., F. Alfieri and C. Ferlan (eds.), Bologna 2012, pp. 139-164.

External links
 
 Paolo Segneri in the Historical Archives of the Pontifical Gregorian University

1624 births
1694 deaths
People from Nettuno
17th-century Italian Jesuits
Italian Roman Catholic missionaries
Jesuit missionaries
Roman Catholic missionaries in Italy